This is a list of jail facilities in New York City. It includes federal prisons, county jails, and city jails run by the New York City Department of Corrections.

Current facilities

Elmhurst Hospital Prison Ward
Lincoln Correctional Facility
Metropolitan Correctional Center, New York
Metropolitan Detention Center, Brooklyn
Rikers Island
Anna M. Kross Center
Benjamin Ward Visit Center
Eric M. Taylor Center
George Motchan Detention Center
George R. Vierno Center
North Infirmary Command
Otis Bantum Correctional Center
Robert N. Davoren Complex
Rose M. Singer Center
West Facility
Vernon C. Bain Correctional Center

Defunct facilities

Arthur Kill Correctional Facility
Bayview Correctional Facility
Bridewell (New York City jail)
Harold A. Wildstein
Ludlow Street Jail
New York Women's House of Detention
Raymond Street Jail
Spofford Juvenile Center
Sugar house prisons (New York)
Walter B. Keane

References

Prisons in New York City
New York City-related lists
New York City